Saad Hamdan is a Lebanese singer, actor and voice actor. He is known for Ghanoujet Baya (2006).

Filmography

Film

Television

Dubbing roles 

 1001 Nights
 Assassin's Creed Syndicate
 Big Hero 6 - Fred
 Bolt - Rhino (Classical Arabic version)
 Deadly 60
 Inside Out
 Ratatouille - Pompidou, Git (Classical Arabic version)
 Steven Universe - Greg, Lars, Ronaldo Fryman, Sour Cream
Lego Nexo Knights - Axl
 Leroy & Stitch - Hämsterviel (Classical Arabic version)
 M.I.High
 Monsters University  - Art, Frank McCay
 Prophet Joseph
 Sonic Boom - Doctor Eggman, Comedy Chimp
 The Looney Tunes Show - Marvin the Martian (Lebanese dubbing version)
 The Smurfs - Chef Smurf, Grouchy Smurf, Painter Smurf (Image Production House version)
 Teen Titans Go! - Ed (MBC 3 version)
 The Men of Angelos
 Tom Clancy's The Division
 Toy Story - Mr. Potato Head (Classical Arabic version)
 Toy Story 2 - Mr. Potato Head (Classical Arabic version)
 Toy Story 3 - Mr. Potato Head (Classical Arabic version)
 Treasure Planet - Delbert Doppler (Classical Arabic version)
 Up - newsreel announcer (Classical Arabic version)

References

External links 

 
 
 

Lebanese male actors
21st-century Lebanese male singers
Lebanese male voice actors
Year of birth missing (living people)
Living people
Lebanese male television actors
21st-century Lebanese male actors